The European Press Prize is an award programme for excellence in journalism across all 47 countries of Europe. It was founded in 2012 by seven European media foundations: The Guardian Foundation, Thomson Reuters Foundation, Jyllands-Posten Foundation, Politiken Foundation, Media Development Investment Fund, Vereniging Veronica and Stichting Democratie en Media. In 2015, The Irish Times Trust Limited joined as a member organisation, and Agora SA followed two years later. In 2020, the organisation Luminate became a member. 

The prizes are awarded each year in five different categories during the European Press Prize Ceremony.

The first ceremony was at De Balie in Amsterdam in 2013, the 2014 awards were given at the Reuters headquarters in London, and in 2015 the European Press Prize visited the JP/Politiken headquarters in Copenhagen. The 2016 awards were presented in Prague with the help of the Forum2000 team. For the fifth anniversary in 2017, the ceremony was held in founding place De Balie in Amsterdam again. In 2018 it took place in Budapest at the Open Archives Society. In 2019 the prizes were awarded in Warsaw at the headquarters of Gazeta Wyborcza. As the COVID-19 pandemic prohibited a live ceremony, the winners of the 2020 and the 2021 edition were announced online.

The organisation is based in Amsterdam.

Jury 
The jury chooses each winner from a shortlist, selected out of all of the submitted work by the preparatory committee. Each of the award categories has a maximum of six nominees on the shortlist. 

Currently, the panel of judges is composed of:

 (chair) Alan Rusbridger, former editor-in-chief of The Guardian
Sylvie Kauffmann, former editor-in-chief of Le Monde and also board member of the Global Editors Network
Alexandra Föderl-Schmid, former editor-in-chief and co-publisher of Der Standard
 Juan Luis Sánchez, co-founder and deputy director of Eldiario.es
Sheila Sitalsing, freelance columnist for De Volkskrant and the Heldring Prize winner for best columnist in the Netherlands

From 2013 until 2020:

 (chair) Sir Harold Evans, editor-at-large of Thomson Reuters and the former editor of the Sunday Times
 Jørgen Ejbol, chairman of the Jyllands-Posten Foundation
Yevgenia Albats, editor-in-chief of the Russian The New Times

Awards 
The European Press Prize is given in four categories. A fifth special award chosen by the jury is optional. Each prize is worth €10,000.

Investigative Reporting Award 
This award is given for "discovering and revealing facts, exposing hidden news to the public".

 2014: Steve Stecklow, Babak Dehghanpisheh and Yeganeh Torbati, Reuters, UK, "The Assets of the Ayatollah";
 2015: , El País, Spain, "How to produce dead guerillas";
 2016: , Revue XXI, France, "Those Who have been Raped raise your hand";
 2017: Center for Investigative Journalism of Serbia, for their series of articles on corruption and organized crime;
 2019: Christo Grozev, Roman Dobrokhotov, Bellingcat, United Kingdom, "Unmasking the Salisbury Poisoning Suspects: A Four-Part Investigation";
 2020: Annemarte Moland, Even Kjølleberg and Ruben Solvang, NRK, Norway, "Trigger Warning";
2021: Roman Anin, Alesya Marohovskaya, Irina Dolinina, Dmitry Velikovsky, Roman Shleynov, Sonya Savina, Olesya Shmagun and Denis Dmitriev, IStories, Russia, "Kirill and Katya: Love, offshores, and administrative resources. How marrying Putin's daughter gave Kirill Shamalov a world of opportunity."

Distinguished Reporting Award 
This award is given for "exceptional reporting, telling a story in the best possible way". Until 2017, the category was called Distinguished Writing Award:

 2014: Sergey Khazov, The New Times magazine, Russia, "The Man in Orange", "Vietnam Town" and "Forbidden Islam";
 2015: Elena Kostyuchenko, Novaya Gazeta, Russia, "Your husband voluntarily went under fire";
 2016: , Duzy Format (Gazeta Wyborcza), Poland, "The Fear-Sick Ward";
 2017: Dialika Neufeld, Der Spiegel, Germany, "Step-uncle Sam"; Felix Hutt, Stern, Germany, "71 Lives".

In 2018 the category was renamed Distinguished Reporting Award.

 2018: Michael Obert, Süddeutsche Zeitung Magazin, Germany, "The human catcher";
 2019: Katrin Kuntz, Marian Blasberg and Christoph Scheuermann, Der Spiegel, Germany, "Fifty-Six Days of Separation";
 2020: Isobel Cockerell, Coda Story, Georgia, "The Uyghur women fighting China’s surveillance state";
2021: Janusz Schwertner, Onet, Poland, "Love in the time of plague."

Opinion Award 
Until 2017, the Commentator Award was given for quality commentary and opinionated journalism. 

 2013: Nikos Chrysoloras, Kathimerini, Greece, "Greece must remain in the Eurozone";
 2014: Boris Dežulović, Globus, Croatia, "Vukovar: a Life-Size Monument to the Dead City";
 2015: Nick Cohen, The Observer, United Kingdom, "The Cowardice of Nigel Farage";
 2016: Gideon Rachman, Financial Times, United Kingdom, "Gideon Rachman Commentary";
 2017: Fintan O'Toole, The Irish Times, Ireland, The Observer and The Guardian, United Kingdom, for his Brexit columns.

Since 2018, the Opinion Award is given for best commentator or remarkable interpretation:

 2018: , Al Jazeera Balkans, Bosnia and Herzegovina, "The third shooting of the boy Petar from Konjic";
 2019: , The Guardian, United Kingdom, "The end of Atlanticism: had Trump killed the ideology that won the cold war?";
 2020: , SME, Slovakia, "How We Stopped Being Comrades";
2021: Iván Zsolt Nagy, HVG.hu, Hungary, "When Trianon Hurts Differently."

Innovation Award 
This category awards journalists for their inventive or groundbreaking way of storytelling. 

 2013: Paul Lewis (journalist), The Guardian, "Reading the Riots";
 2015: The Migrants’ Files team, The Migrants’ Files, Italy Switzerland, France, Sweden, Spain and Greece, "The Migrants’ Files: Surveying migrants’ deaths at Europe's door";
 2016: Raquel Moleiro, Hugo Franco and Joana Beleza, Newspaper Expresso, Portugal, "Killing and Dying for Allah - Five Portuguese Members of Islamic State";
 2017: , Bellingcat, The Netherlands, "The Turkish Coup through the Eyes of its Plotters";
 2018: Megan Lucero, Maeve McClenaghan, Gareth Davies, Charles Boutaud, Kirsty Styles, for their organisation Bureau Local;
 2020: Decât o Revistă team, Decât o Revistă, Romania, "How DoR organized an all-team pop-up newsroom in Transylvania";
2021: Maldita.es team, Maldita.es, Spain, "Maldita.es' WhatsApp Chatbot to thrive a fact-checking operation on disinformation."

Special Award 
The Special Award is optional for the jury and allows them to single out high quality journalism that they think deserves special recognition. This could be awarded to an individual journalist, news organisation or specific piece of journalism.

 2014: Alan Rusbridger, The Guardian, United Kingdom; Yavuz Baydar, by censored media, Turkey;
 2015: Paul Radu, Drew Sullivan, Miranda Patrucić, et al. for their organisation The Organized Crime and Corruption Reporting Project;
 2016: Gert van Langendonck, NRC, The Netherlands, "Off to Europe"; Amrai Coen and Henning Sussebach, Die Zeit, Germany, "In the Promised Land"; Anders Fjellberg and Tomm W. Chriistiansen, Dagbladet, Norway, "The Wetsuitman";
 2017: Irina Tacu, Ana Maria Ciobanu, Andreea Giuclea, Christian Lupșa and Oana Sandu, Decât o Revistă, Romania, "Colectiv";
 2018: Ida Nyegård Espersen, Jyllands-Posten, Denmark, "This crime only requires poverty, internet, and a distant buyer";
 2019: Forbidden Stories team and partners, for their organisation Forbidden Stories;
 2020: BIRN Bosnia and Herzegovina team, for their reporting on war crimes trials and other transitional justice issues.
2021: Paying tribute to all brave journalists working in Belarus, represented by the Mediazona Belarus team behind "Brutalised Minsk: how Belarusian police beat protesters."

Changes to categories 
The first edition of the Prize involved two categories that were discontinued the following year. The Editing Award went to Ihor Pochynok for his publications in the Ukrainian Newspaper Ekspres. The News Reporting Award went to Orla Borg, Carsten Ellegaard Christensen and Morten Pihl for their piece "Morten Storm", published in Jyllands-Posten. 

The Investigative Reporting Award and Special Award have since been added to the categories, as well as the Distinguished Writing Award, which was later named Distinguished Reporting Award. The Commentator Award was later changed to Opinion Award.

European Cartoon Award 
In 2019, the European Cartoon Award was founded in cooperation with Studio Europa Maastricht. This new Award aims to promote and encourage European cartoonists, while preserving the endangered form of art and great asset to journalism. The winner of the first edition was the French cartoonist and illustrator Anne Derenne for her cartoon “Jenga – the earth’s sixth mass distinction.”

See also
:Category:European Press Prize winners

References

External links
European Press Prize
European Press Prize Winners and Nominees
European Press Prize Cartoon Award Nominees 
Open Archives Society

Journalism awards
Awards established in 2012